Grand Southern Trunk Road (or) National Highways 45 is an arterial road in Tamil Nadu. It is also known as Chennai–Trichy Highway. The Road starts from Kathipara Junction in St Thomas Mount, Chennai towards Tiruchirappalli. It branches out from Anna Salai (previously known as Mount Road).

The Road runs through important localities like Meenambakkam, Pallavaram, Chrompet, Tambaram, Vandalur, Kilambakkam, Guduvanchery, Paranur, Chengalpattu, Madurantakam, Tindivanam, Villupuram, Vikravandi Ulundurpet and Perambalur.

Major Junctions
Chennai City
 Mount-Poonamallee Road near Kathipara Junction.
 Mount-Medavakkam High Road in St.Thomas Mount.
 Pallavaram-Kundrathur-Poonamallee Road (Pammal Main Road) in Pallavaram.
 Pallavaram-Thiruneermalai Road in Pallavaram.
 Pallavaram-Thuraipakkam Radial Road in Pallavaram.
 Chitlapakkam and Hasthinapuram Main Road near MIT Bridge Along GST Road.
 Gandhi Road in Tambaram.
 Velachery Main Road and Mudichur Road in Tambaram.
 Chennai Bypass Road in Irumbuliyur.
 Chennai Outer Ring Road in Vandalur.
 Vandalur-Kelambakkam Road in Vandalur.
 Guduvancheri Tiruporur
 Kotteripattu Near Tindivanam

Developments
 NHAI to repair Palar Bridge in Grand Southern Trunk Road near Chengalpattu. 
 Double Deck Structure proposed between Airport and Irumbuliyur along GST Road.
 NHAI set to rectify 18 accident-prone spots in GST Road.

References

Roads in Tamil Nadu